Stephen John Molloy (born 11 March 1969) is an English former professional rugby league footballer who played in the 1990s and 2000s, and coached in the 2000s. Steve is the current Head Coach of the ambitious Manchester Rangers RLFC who are currently working on plans to enter the semi-professional & professional ranks in the near future.

Background
Steve Molloy was born in Gorton, Manchester, Lancashire, England. Nickname Big Face

Playing career

International honours
Steve Molloy won caps for England while at Leeds in 1992 against Wales, while at Featherstone Rovers in 1996 against France (interchange/substitute), and Wales, while at Sheffield Eagles in 1999 against France (2 matches), and won caps for Great Britain while at Leeds in 1993 against France, while at Featherstone Rovers in 1994 against Fiji, 1996 against Fiji (interchange/substitute), and New Zealand (interchange/substitute).

County Cup Final appearances
Steve Molloy played right-, i.e. number 10, in Warrington's 24–16 victory over Oldham in the 1989 Lancashire County Cup Final during the 1989–90 season at Knowsley Road, St. Helens on Saturday 14 October 1989.

Club career
Molloy made his début for Warrington on Sunday 28 August 1988, and he played his last match for Warrington on Monday 16 April 1990, he made his début for Featherstone Rovers on Sunday 29 August 1993, and he played his last match for Featherstone Rovers during the 1997 season.

References

External links
Statistics at wolvesplayers.thisiswarrington.co.uk
Statistics at orl-heritagetrust.org.uk

1969 births
Living people
Batley Bulldogs players
England national rugby league team captains
England national rugby league team players
English rugby league coaches
English rugby league players
Featherstone Rovers captains
Featherstone Rovers players
Great Britain national rugby league team players
Huddersfield Giants players
Leeds Rhinos players
Oldham R.L.F.C. coaches
Oldham R.L.F.C. players
People from Gorton
Rugby league players from Manchester
Rugby league props
Sheffield Eagles (1984) players
Warrington Wolves players